Paseka may refer to
Paseka (name)
Paseka (Olomouc District), a village and municipality in the Czech Republic
Horní Paseka, a village and municipality in the Czech Republic

See also
 
 Pasieka (disambiguation)